Yu Hua (born 19 January 1981 in Beijing, China) is a female Chinese rower, who competed for Team China at the 2008 Summer Olympics in the women's lightweight double sculls.

Major performances
1999/2005 Asian Championships – 1st LW2X;
2005 National Games – 3rd LW2X;
2006 World Cup Munich/Poznan – 1st LW2X/lightweight single sculls;
2007 World Cup Amsterdam – 1st LW2X

References

1981 births
Living people
Chinese female rowers
Olympic rowers of China
Rowers from Beijing
Rowers at the 2006 Asian Games
Rowers at the 2000 Summer Olympics
Rowers at the 2008 Summer Olympics
World Rowing Championships medalists for China
Asian Games competitors for China
20th-century Chinese women
21st-century Chinese women